Specter Aircraft, Inc. was an American aircraft manufacturer, founded by James D Gessford in 1997 and based in Bancroft, Idaho. The company specialized in the design and manufacture of light aircraft in the form of kits for amateur construction.

The company was incorporated on 23 July 1997 and had its status administratively revoked on 17 February 2000.

The company was formed to develop and market the Specter II, a canard configuration two-seat aircraft intended to be sold in kit form. Federal Aviation Administration records indicate that only one was built.

Aircraft

References

Defunct aircraft manufacturers of the United States
Homebuilt aircraft